The following highways are numbered 360:

Canada
Manitoba Provincial Road 360
New Brunswick Route 360
Newfoundland and Labrador Route 360
 Nova Scotia Route 360
Quebec Route 360

Japan
  Japan National Route 360

United States
U.S. Route 360
 Arizona State Route 360 (former)
   Georgia State Route 360
 Hawaii Route 360
   K-360 (Kansas highway)
 Maryland Route 360 (former)
  Missouri Route 360
 Nevada State Route 360
 New York:
  New York State Route 360 (former)
 County Route 360 (Albany County, New York)
   Ohio State Route 360
 Puerto Rico Highway 360
 Texas:
   Texas State Highway 360
   Texas State Highway Loop 360
  Farm to Market Road 360
  Virginia State Route 360

References